Fayd or Fa'idah is a village in Makkah Province, in western Saudi Arabia. The Expedition of Qatan was ordered by Muhammad and took place here.

See also

List of battles of Muhammad
 List of cities and towns in Saudi Arabia
 Regions of Saudi Arabia

References

Populated places in Mecca Province